Avord is a commune in the Cher department in the Centre-Val de Loire region of France.

Geography
The commune is home to Avord Air Base, the second largest of the French Air and Space Force bases.

Population

Places of interest
 The church, dating from the twelfth century.
 A watermill, the  Moulin de la Gravelle.
 The chateau du Therieux, dating from the sixteenth century.

Personalities
 Élisabeth Catez, was born on the military base in 1880.
 Captain Georges Madon, fighter pilot of World War I, trained at the airforce base here, which now bears his name.

Twin town
 Aindling,  Germany since 1977.

See also
Communes of the Cher department

References

External links

Official website of Avord 

Communes of Cher (department)